East Ham is a London Underground station on High Street North in the East Ham neighbourhood of the London Borough of Newham in east London, England. The station is on the District line and Hammersmith & City line. The station was opened on 31 March 1858 by the London, Tilbury and Southend Railway on a new more direct route from Fenchurch Street to Barking. The large Edwardian station building was constructed to accommodate the electric District Railway services on an additional set of tracks opened in 1905. It has high and growing usage for a suburban station with 13.1 million entries and exits in 2010. It is in London fares zones 3 and 4.

History
The London, Tilbury and Southend line from Bow to Barking was constructed east to west through the middle of the Parish of East Ham in 1858. Prior to the building of the line trains took a longer route via Stratford and Forest Gate to the north. The new line initially also had stations at Bromley and Plaistow, with Upton Park added as the next station to the west of East Ham in 1877. District line, then known as the District Railway, service began in 1902. 

The District line was electrified in 1905 over a second pair of tracks, and the service was cut back from Upminster to East Ham; the station then served as the eastern terminus, where passengers transferred to steam trains, until 1908 when electrification was extended to Barking. In 1936 the Metropolitan line service was introduced. In 1990 the station, along with other stations beyond Aldgate East, was transferred to the new Hammersmith & City line.
A short spur line to Woodgrange Park was opened in 1894 and was closed in 1958.

Accidents and incidents
On 12 November 1959, a passenger train overran signals and was in a rear-end collision with another standing at the station. Thirteen people were injured.
On 14 February 1990, an empty stock train formed of a Class 305 and a Class 308 electric multiple unit was derailed.

Design
The station has two platforms, one for each direction. Much of the original Victorian station architecture has been retained and some restoration work was carried out during 2005. The disused platforms of the Fenchurch Street to Southend services, withdrawn in 1962, are to the south of the current platforms. A disused bay platform on the northern side of the station, closed in 1958, connected to the Tottenham and Forest Gate Railway (now the Gospel Oak to Barking line) via a curve.

Services

Eastbound
12tph to Upminster (District line)
3tph to Barking (District line)
6tph to Barking (Hammersmith & City line)

Westbound
6tph to Richmond (District line)
6tph to Ealing Broadway (District line)
3tph to Wimbledon (District line)
6tph to Hammersmith (Hammersmith & City line)

Connections
London Buses routes 101, 147, 238, 300, 304, 325, 376 and 474 serve the station.

Gallery

References

External links
London Transport Museum Photographic Archive

District line stations
Hammersmith & City line stations
Tube stations in the London Borough of Newham
Former London, Tilbury and Southend Railway stations
Railway stations in Great Britain opened in 1858
East Ham
19th-century architecture in the United Kingdom
Grade II listed buildings in the London Borough of Newham
Grade II listed railway stations